Events in the year 1906 in Bulgaria.

Incumbents

Events 

 20 April – The "Vazduhoplavatelno Otdelenie" (roughly translated as Aviation Squad) was created. This was the earliest version of the modern Bulgarian Air Force.

References 

 
1900s in Bulgaria
Years of the 20th century in Bulgaria
Bulgaria
Bulgaria